Puppo is a surname. Notable people with the surname include:

Federico Puppo (born 1986), Uruguayan footballer
Giuseppe Puppo (born 1957), Italian journalist and writer
Henri Puppo (1913–2012), Italian cyclist
Romano Puppo (1933–1994), Italian actor
Sandro Puppo (1918–1986), Italian footballer